Edwin Hogan (12 May 1893 – 21 September 1957) was an  Australian rules footballer who played with St Kilda in the Victorian Football League (VFL).

Notes

External links 

1893 births
1957 deaths
Australian rules footballers from Victoria (Australia)
St Kilda Football Club players